Egill Ólafsson (born 9 February 1953) is an Icelandic singer, songwriter, and actor. He is married to the actress Tinna Gunnlaugsdóttir.

Education
Egill Ólafsson studied playing guitar and piano when he was young and was part of a boys' brass band under the direction of Karl Otto Runólfsson.

While he was a student at Hamrahlid College from 1970 until 1974, Egill Ólafsson sang in the choir of the school Kór MH.

1970 he started to study at the Tónlistarskólinn (music school in Reykjavík). The disciplines he was studying were singing and composing. In 1976 Egill Ólafsson graduated at Tónlistarskólinn In Reykjavík.

Professional life
Among his compositions are music for choirs, brass band music and music for strings and trumpets. He has composed around 30 theatrical works. He composed for musicals Grettir, Eva Luna and Come Dance With Me, the latter having a run on off-Broadway in 1996. His works have been played by various ensembles like Spilverk þjóðanna, Stuðmenn, Hinn íslenski Þursaflokkur, Tríó Björns Thoroddsen, Blái hatturinn, Les Grand Tango and The Icelandic Sound Company. And just recently (2015–16) he's been working with the German group Strom & Wasser as a co-writer and musician. The product has been released by Traumton in Berlin, called "Reykjavik"  (Double Album).

He has landed many stage roles in Icelandic Theatre and film roles in Icelandic, German and Scandinavian films.

Under the mononym Egill he released a number of albums mainly with Stuðmenn / Spilverk þjóðanna labels. 
He also co-wrote materials with Finnish artist Matti Kallio, a resident of Iceland.

Egill Olafsson also is a musical-performer. Several times he was performing leading characters in the Icelandic productions of different musicals at the Icelandic National Theatre, for instance Evita (Perón), Carmen negra (Escamillo), Three Penny Opera (Peachum), Kiss me Kate (Fred Graham) and also in many of the plays he has written as composer.

He appeared as Javert in Vesalingarnir, the Icelandic adaptation of Les Misérables at the National Theatre, after having played the role of Jean Valjean in the same musical a quarter of a century earlier.
At Les Misérables: The Dream Cast in Concert on the occasion of the 10th anniversary of the opening of the Original West End production of the musical Les Misérables Egill Ólafsson was performing as one of  the Seventeen Valjeans at the second encore. It was filmed in October 1995 at the Royal Albert Hall and released on DVD, VHS and LaserDisc distributed by Sony Pictures (US/CAN) and BBC Video (UK).

Personal life
He is married to the actress and former artistic director at the National Theatre in Iceland (2005-2015) Tinna Gunnlaugsdóttir.

Before the Icelandic loan guarantees referendum, 2010 Egill Ólafsson was one of the Icelandic celebrities, who spoke out to vote "no".

At the elections for the Icelandic parliament Althing in April 2013, Egill Ólafsson was a candidate of Lýðræðisvaktin (Iceland Democratic Party).

In October 2013 his work was honored by FTT (Society Of Songwriters In Iceland).

On 17 June 2015 his work was honored by the President of Iceland. Egill Ólafsson was awarded with the Falcon Order Medal.

In October 2022, it was revealed that Egill had been diagnosed with Parkinson's disease.

Work

Discography

Albums
1991: Tifa tifa
1992: Blátt blátt
2001: Angelus Novus / Nýr engill
2003: Brot...Músík úr leikhúsinu
2006: Miskunn dalfiska
2007: Hymnalög
2012: Vetur
2013: Örlög mín
2018: Fjall

Singles
2013: "Ekkert þras" (with Moses Hightower, Lay Low and Högni Egilsson)

Filmography

Compositions

(Music composed for theatre)

The City Of Crooks 1976 The Theatre School Of Iceland
The Beginners 1977 The National Theatre of Iceland
Mr. Klemensson 1978 (Ballet) NT (Icel)
The Cheery´s On The North - Mountain  (Kabuki – Play) 1979 NT (Icel) /Det Norske Teater
The Saga Of Grettir 1980 City Theatre in Iceland
Schocklate For Silja 1982 NT (Icel)
Ich tanze mit dir (Ballet) NT (Icel) 1987
The Steamship 1990 / The Theatre School Of Iceland
Platanov 1992 City Theatre in Reykjavík/Malmö Statsteater
Uncle Vanja 1992 City Theatre in Reykjavík
Eva Luna (The Musical) 1994 (The Musical) City Theatre in Reykjavík
Tears And Endearment (original Icelandic title: Þrek og tár) 1995 NT (Icel)
As You Like It 1996 NT (Icel)
Come Dance With Me 1997 Cernucini Teatre (Off – BRDW)
Mice And Man Loftkastalinn 1998
Anna Karenina NT (Icel.) 1999
Day Of Hope City Theatre in Reykjavík 2006
Four Jews On Parnassus Neue Nationalgalerie Berlin - 3 November 2008
Viva la Vida/Frida Kahló NT (Icel) 2009
The Women Of The Parlament NT (Icel) 2013

References

External links
Official website

Egill Olafsson
Egill Olafsson
Egill Olafsson
Egill Olafsson
Egill Olafsson
1953 births
Living people